Matti Juhani Raekallio (born 14 October 1954 in Helsinki) is a Finnish pianist.

He has performed in Europe, the U.S. and Asia, having debuted at the Carnegie Recital Hall in 1980. A professor at the Swedish Royal College of Music (1994–1995), Hochschule für Musik, Theater und Medien Hannover (2005–2010, 2014–) and the Sibelius Academy (1998–2008), Raekallio trained Antti Siirala and Gergely Boganyi at the latter. He is a scholar on piano playing technique and a former member of the Research Committee on Culture and Society of the Finnish Academy of Science and Letters. He taught at the Juilliard School from 2007 to 2014 while giving master classes in many countries. In 2014, he decided to leave the Juilliard School and started to teach in Hochschule für Musik, Theater und Medien Hannover again. His most famous student is Igor Levit, who credits Raekallio as a major influence. 

Since 2015, he has been back in New York City, teaching at the Juilliard School.

Raekallio has recorded about 20 CDs, including Sergey Prokofiev's complete Piano Sonatas and Aarre Merikanto's, Anton Rubinstein's and Einar Englund's Piano Concertos for Ondine.

References

External links
 Arthur Rubinstein Competition, Tel Aviv
 Ondine.
 Juilliard School.
 Doctoral dissertation by Eeva Kaisa Hyry.

Finnish classical pianists
1954 births
Living people
Academic staff of the Hochschule für Musik, Theater und Medien Hannover
21st-century classical pianists
Finnish expatriates in Germany
Finnish expatriates in Sweden
Finnish expatriates in the United States